Konza is a small town in Machakos County, Kenya. Machakos town, the county capital, is located 35 kilometres northeast of Konza.

Konza is located in Kimutwa location of Central division of Machakos County. Konza is part of Machakos municipality and Machakos Town Constituency.

Transport 
Konza is a junction on the Kenya Railways network. Konza is located along Mombasa - Nairobi railway, and branch line to Magadi diverts at Konza.

Technopolis 
Konza will also be host to the proposed Konza Technopolis.

See also 

 Transport in Kenya
 Railway stations in Kenya
 Konza Technopolis

References

Further reading
 Hidaka, Hiroko (日高 博子 Hidaka Hiroko). 『コンザ村の子どもたち―ケニア・ナイロビ日本人学校教師の記録』 ("Children of Konza Village - Record of a teacher of the Nairobi Japanese School, Kenya"). Holp Shuppan. November 1984. . - Profile at Google Books

External links 

 Konza Technology City Kenya

Populated places in Eastern Province (Kenya)